The 1932 Chatham Cup was the tenth annual nationwide knockout football competition in New Zealand.

The competition was run on a regional basis, with seven regional associations (Auckland, Walkato, Wellington, Manawatu, Buller, Canterbury, and Otago) each holding separate qualifying rounds. 

The Westland Association also ran qualifying finals. Taylorville were beaten by Dobson 5 - 1. Runanga and Cobden had to play two replays of the second Westland - Chatham Cup semi-final after the first result, a 4 - 2 victory for Runanga was protested by Cobden. The first replay was played at Dunollie where the large, raucous crowd eventually spilled on to the ground after a fight between two players with one spectator striking the referee. The result, 3 - 2 to Cobden was protested by Runanga. In the deciding third match Cobden finally beat Runanga 4 - 1. In the Westland - Chatham Cup final at Victoria Park, Dobson drew with Cobden 3 - 3. In the replay a week later on the 16th of July, Dobson beat Cobden 3 - 1, once again at Victoria Park. A Westland - Buller decider between Dobson and Millerton All Blacks was scheduled for the 23rd of July, with the victor to play Thistle (Christchurch) in early August.

Teams taking part in the final rounds are known to have included Auckland YMCA, Hamilton Wanderers, St. Andrews (Manawatu), Wellington Marist, Riccarton, Millerton All Blacks and Maori Hill (Dunedin).

The 1932 final
Wellington Marist's Eddie Barton became the third player in Chatham Cup history to score a final hat-trick, in front of a crowd of 5000 at the Basin Reserve. The five-goal margin in the final remained a record until 1958. The game was described by contemporary sources as being a fine one,  though it was one-sided. The first goal came after 25 minutes when Marist's Stan Marshment scrambled the ball across the line. Barton doubled the score before the interval. In the second half, playing with the stiff breeze, Jim Kershaw (later to become NZFA Chairman) curled the ball into the net directly from a corner. Millerton didn't take the opportunity to pull one back, missing a penalty, and Marist rubbed home the win with two further goals from Barton late on.

Millerton, a busy coalmining town in the 1930s, is now a ghost town.

Results

Semi-finals ("Island finals")

Final

References

Rec.Sport.Soccer Statistics Foundation New Zealand 1932 page

Chatham Cup
Chatham Cup
Chatham Cup